Crown London Aspinalls (or Aspinall's) is a private gambling club, established by John Aspinall in London since the 1960s. Crown London Aspinalls is currently at 27–28 Curzon Street, Mayfair, London.

History
Club founder John Aspinall, known as "Aspers" to his friends, was a conservationist and the stepson of Sir George Osborne. He was a breeder of wild animals and funded his zoos, to a large extent, from house winnings.

In the 1960s, the building was known as the White Elephant Club, a dining destination. Later in 1992, Aspinall turned the property in to a casino named Aspinall's. He commissioned a bust of Lord Lucan, a close friend of Aspinall who disappeared in November 1974, after the murder of Sandra Rivett, the nanny of Lucan's children.  It remains prominently displayed. The elephant from the White Elephant Club is still at the main entrance of the casino.

It is owned by Crown Resorts, a global entertainment chain headquartered in Melbourne, Australia. Smart casual dress is required to enter the casino.

Facilities 
The casino has 16 gaming tables. Games include Roulette, Blackjack, Baccarat, Three card poker and Poker tournaments.

Racial abuse allegations 
In July 2020, a black female croupier filed a claim with London Employment tribunal alleging the casino allowed some of its members to racially abuse black employees, granting a request by a customer to be served only by "female dealers with fair skin" and "western-looking female staff". In accommodating the request, the casino refused to approve a shift-swap by the member of staff so they could look after their child at the weekend. In November 2021, the tribunal found in favour of the claimant, that the behaviour of the casino constituted racial discrimination and that the organisation's training systems were inadequate. It also acknowledged another racial discrimination claim against the company relating to an incident in 2015 would have succeeded had it been initiated earlier.

See also
Clermont Club

References

Buildings and structures in the City of Westminster
Casinos in England
Clubs and societies in London